Airborne Forces Day also known as Paratroopers' Day is a professional military holiday in Russia and other countries, celebrated on 2 August annually. It is the official holiday of the former Soviet Airborne forces.

History
The birthday of the Airborne Forces is considered to be 2 August 1930. On this day at military exercises of the Moscow Military District, a 12 member paratrooper unit was parachuted for performing a tactical task. Airborne Forces Day is currently celebrated on 2 August, on the basis of the Decree of the President of the Russian Federation dated May 31, 2006 “On the Establishment of Professional Holidays and Memorable Days in the Armed Forces of the Russian Federation".

Until 2017 paratrooper's day in Ukraine was celebrated on 2 August. Since 2017 the day is celebrated on November 21 which is the day of the patron of the paratroopers, Archangel Michael. According to President Petro Poroshenko this move was "Ukrainianization of the historical and political calendar - to replace the Soviet-Russian imposed on us."

Celebrations
Airborne Forces Day, which is a professional holiday for active and reserve airborne troops, is traditionally celebrated throughout Russia, Belarus and other Commonwealth of Independent States countries. During the holiday, many cities traditionally held demonstrations of paratroopers, concerts, charity events, festivals, crafts fairs and souvenirs exhibition and sale. In some Russian cities, it is customary to turn off the fountains on the day of the Airborne Forces and to release all employees responsible for their work on a day off. This is done in order to reduce the damage from the celebration.

Common meeting places

In Almaty, veterans are found in the Central Park of Culture and Rest named after Gorky.
In Vitebsk, paratroopers meet on Victory Square.
In Donetsk, veterans are found in the Shcherbakov Park and near the monument to the fallen Afghan warriors.
In Kyiv, the meeting places of veterans include the National Museum of the History of Ukraine in the Second World War, a monument to soldiers-internationalists, and less often, Maidan Nezalezhnosti. The Ukrainian Air Assault Forces celebrates its own anniversary on 17 November.
In Moscow, the traditional places for annual meetings of the Blue Berets are Gorky Central Park of Culture and Culture and Poklonnaya Gora. The capital's first ever Paratroopers Day parade was held in 2018 on the southern part of Red Square near Saint Basil's Cathedral and the Monument to Minin and Pozharsky marking 88 years of the Airborne Forces.
In St. Petersburg, traditional meeting places include Krestovsky Island and Palace Square.

See also
Police and Internal Affairs Servicemen's Day
Border Guards Day
Navy Day
Defender of the Fatherland Day
Paratroopers' Day (Tajikistan)

References

External links

August observances
Military of Russia
Soviet Airborne Forces
Military of Belarus
Military of Kazakhstan
Public holidays in Russia
Public holidays in Belarus
Public holidays in Kazakhstan
Public holidays in the Soviet Union
Former public holidays in Ukraine
Summer events in Russia